Albert "Ankles" Bennett (16 July 1944 – 21 December 2016) was a footballer who played for Rotherham, Newcastle and Norwich as a centre forward, in addition to representing England at under-23 level while at Rotherham. He was forced to retire due to injury in 1971 and had a spell as player-manager of Bury Town.

He was born in Chester-le-Street and signed for Rotherham in October 1961. There, he became the only player from that team ever to win England Under-23 honours. He signed for Newcastle in July 1965 for £27,000, making his debut against Blackpool. While at Newcastle he was rugby-tackled by Emlyn Hughes, giving rise to Hughes' nickname of "Crazy Horse". He moved to Norwich in February 1969 for £25,000 to replace Hugh Curran who had transferred to Wolverhampton Wanderers. He scored a hat-trick against Portsmouth at the end of the 1969–70 season.

However, due to injury, he was forced to retire after being substituted against Leicester City in February 1971. He then had a spell as player-manager at Bury, followed by managing various non-league clubs.

Bennett spent his later life living in Norwich, running the Elm Tavern pub in the city.

References

External links
 Profile at Toon1892
 Past Players Profile at Rotherham United
 Sing Up The River - Stars of the Past - Albert Bennett

1944 births
2016 deaths
Sportspeople from Chester-le-Street
Footballers from County Durham
Newcastle United F.C. players
Rotherham United F.C. players
Norwich City F.C. players
Bury Town F.C. players
English footballers
England under-23 international footballers
British publicans
Association football forwards